In typography, an asterism, ⁂, is a typographic symbol consisting of three asterisks placed in a triangle, which is used for a variety of purposes. The name originates from the astronomical term for a group of stars.

The asterism was originally used as a type of dinkus in typography, though increasingly rarely.

It can also be used to mean "untitled" or author or title withheld as seen, for example, in some editions of Album for the Young by composer Robert Schumann (№ 21, 26, and 30).

In meteorology, an asterism in a station model indicates moderate snowfall.

Dinkus

A dinkus is a typographical device to divide text, such as at section breaks. Its purpose is to "indicate minor breaks in text", to call attention to a passage, or to separate sub-chapters in a book. An asterism used this way is thus a type of dinkus: nowadays this usage of the symbol is nearly obsolete. More commonly used dinkuses are three dots or three asterisks in a horizontal row. A small black and white drawing or a fleuron (❧) may be used for the same purpose. Otherwise, an extra space between paragraphs is used. A dinkus may be used in conjunction with the extra space to mark a smaller subdivision than a sub-chapter.

See also
 Dingbat
 Ellipsis (three dots in mid-sentence)
 Signature mark

References

Typographical symbols
Punctuation